Mr. PG is a mascot for and monument in Prince George, British Columbia. He was first constructed in 1960 as a symbol of the importance of the forestry industry to the city. He currently stands at the junction of Highway 97 and Highway 16. He is 8.138 m (26.70 ft) tall and his head is 1.5 m (4 ft 11 in) in diameter.

Mr. PG's first appearance occurred on May 8, 1960 at a Rotary International conference taking place at the Simon Fraser Inn. Later that year, he took part in the Prince George May Day parade and could speak and bow. In 1961, he was entered in the Kelowna Regatta and the Vancouver PNE Parade, and also travelled to Smithers. Two years later, he appeared in the 1963 Grey Cup parade. In 1970, he was installed at his current location, the intersection of Highways 16 and 97.

Mr. PG was trademarked by the City in 1985.  In 1997, children's performer Al Simmons, wrote a song about him titled Mr. PG. In 2009, Canada Post featured him on a stamp.

In April 2020, he flew a flag emblazoned with a red heart as part of a community support initiative during the coronavirus pandemic in the province.

References

External links

City of Prince George
Tourism PG

Buildings and structures in Prince George, British Columbia
Monuments and memorials in British Columbia